Teleorhinus may refer to:

Teleorhinus (bug), a genus of bugs

Terminonaris, a genus of extinct archosaurs, previously known as Teleorhinus